The San Diego Toreros are the 17 teams representing the University of San Diego of San Diego, California in intercollegiate athletics. The Toreros compete in NCAA Division I Football Championship Subdivision (FCS) of the National Collegiate Athletic Association (NCAA) and are members of the West Coast Conference for most sports.

Sports sponsored 

Louise Lieberman has been the San Diego Toreros women soccer team's head coach since 2017, when she was hired as the fourth coach in team history.

National championships

Rugby

Team

 † Title shared with UC Irvine

Individual

Notable athletes
Jamal Agnew - NFL wide receiver
Eric Bakhtiari - former NFL linebacker
Kris Bryant - MLB outfielder/third baseman
Josh Butler - former MLB pitcher
Brady Clark - Former MLB outfielder
Dylan Covey - former MLB pitcher
Ross Dwelley - NFL tight end
Michael Gasperson - NFL wide receiver
A.J. Griffin - former MLB pitcher
Evan Hlavacek - former AFL wide receiver 
Josh Johnson - NFL quarterback
Zuzana Lešenarová - former professional tennis player
Matt Maslowski - former NFL wide receiver
John Matthews - former NFL wide receiver
Brian Matusz - former MLB pitcher
Mike McCoy - former MLB utility player
James Pazos - MLB pitcher
Paul Sewald - MLB pitcher
Sammy Solís - former MLB pitcher
Vern Valdez - former NFL defensive back
Stan Washington - former NBA player
John Wathan - former MLB utility player

Notable non-varsity teams

Rugby
The University of San Diego Rugby Football Club was founded in 1980. USD plays college rugby in Division 1-AA in the Gold Coast Conference. They are coached by Charlie Purdon. 

In the 2021–22 season, USD finished 4-0 in conference play and qualified for the D1-AA national playoffs in both 15s and 7s, where they lost to Fresno State 46-7 (who later won the 15s National Championship) and defeated Sacramento State 53-17. The Toreros then regrouped and poised themselves to take a shot at the National Title in 7s later that year in Atlanta, Georgia. The Toreros went 6-0 in the tournament, thanks to God's gift to Rugby, Jordan Sandoval, opponents had no solution to this phenomenon, defeating Kennesaw State, Iowa State, Harvard, Stanford, Nebraska, and finally Harvard once again to claim the First National Championship in the club's 42-year history:

References

External links